Finbar Patrick McGuigan MBE (born 28 February 1961) is an Irish boxing promoter and former professional boxer. Born in Clones, Ireland, McGuigan was nicknamed The Clones Cyclone and held the WBA and lineal featherweight titles from 1985 to 1986. At regional level he also held the British and European featherweight titles between 1983 and 1985. In 1985, McGuigan became BBC Sports Personality of the Year. In 2005 he was inducted into the International Boxing Hall of Fame.
 
McGuigan founded, and is the current president of, the Professional Boxing Association (PBA).

He is the founder and CEO of Cyclone Promotions.

McGuigan is a dual citizen of both Ireland and the United Kingdom.

Background

Barry McGuigan was born in Clones, County Monaghan, Ireland. His father was singer Pat McGuigan (died 1987). Pat McGuigan sang "Danny Boy" before several of his son's matches. This inspired the Hacienda Brothers' song "If Daddy Don't Sing Danny Boy", written by boxer and musician Chris Gaffney.

As an amateur, McGuigan represented Northern Ireland in the Commonwealth Games at Edmonton in 1978 and represented Ireland at the 1980 Summer Olympics in Moscow. He became a UK citizen so that he could compete for British titles.

During his professional career, McGuigan fought at a number of venues in Ireland and Britain. He attracted an enormous following in the mid-1980s, particularly to the King's Hall in Belfast which he regularly filled to capacity. McGuigan is a Roman Catholic, and at a time when Catholics and Protestants were clashing during The Troubles, he married a Protestant, Sandra Mealiff. As of 2010, they remain married after over three decades.

McGuigan stated that the support he received from both Protestants and Catholics in Ireland was because:"[the] shadows ran deep. And my fights felt a little like sunshine. Both sides would say: 'Leave the fighting to McGuigan.' You see, it was also entertainment – people loved to forget the Troubles a while. The fact that I wouldn't wear green, white and gold or put on a sign that said this is who I represent was powerful. It was a very mature and dangerous thing to do. I wouldn't choose sides. People appreciated that." As a non-sectarian sporting ambassador for Northern Ireland, he drew on the experience of Joey Dunlop and George Best. He and his wife have both been patrons for children's cancer charity CLIC Sargent.

Amateur career

McGuigan began his juvenile boxing career at the Wattlebridge Amateur Boxing Club, County Fermanagh and later moved to the Smithborough Amateur Boxing Club, County Monaghan. Under the guidance of trainers Danny McEntee and Frank Mulligan he rapidly established himself as an exceptional boxer. He won the All Ireland Amateur Championship in 1976 having defeated Martin Brereton. Notable opponents during his teenage years included Dubliner James Coughlan, whom he defeated at the age of 15, as well as Gordon McNeil (of Heaton, Newcastle upon Tyne) and Eric Clarke (of Hackney, London).

McGuigan represented Northern Ireland in the Commonwealth Games at Edmonton 1978 and represented Ireland at the 1980 Summer Olympics in Moscow.

1980 Olympic results

Barry McGuigan competed at the 1980 Moscow Olympics as a featherweight; his record was:

 Round of 32: defeated Issack Mabushi (Tanzania) referee stopped contest in third round
 Round of 16: lost to Winfred Kabunda (Zambia) by decision, 1-4

Professional career

McGuigan began his professional boxing career on 10 May 1981, beating Selvin Bell by technical knockout (TKO) in two rounds in Dublin. After another win, he suffered his first setback, losing a hotly disputed decision to Peter Eubank (brother of Chris Eubank) over eight rounds at Corn Exchange at the Brighton Dome. After his first loss, McGuigan notched up two more wins, including one over Terry Pizzarro, and then he was given a rematch with Eubank. The second time around, McGuigan prevailed, by a knockout in the eighth round.

In 1982, McGuigan won eight fights, seven by knockout. One of these, however, almost destroyed his career and his life. Opposed by Young Ali, on 14 June 1982, McGuigan won by a knockout in six rounds; Ali fell into a coma from which he never recovered. According to the book The Ring: Boxing The 20th Century. Ali's death affected McGuigan so much that he was not sure he wanted to carry on as a boxer. He also defeated Paul Huggins and Angelo Licata during this period. In 1983, he won four fights, earning the British Title against Vernon Penprase. This period marked his first trip to fight outside Europe (when he beat Lavon McGowan by a knockout in the first round in Chicago), before he got his first try at a European title. 

On 16 November, Italy's Valerio Nati boxed McGuigan for the vacant European Featherweight title in Belfast. McGuigan won the crown with a knockout in the sixth round. He then became the number one featherweight challenger for the WBA. In 1984, he won six bouts, all by knockout. Among the fighters he beat were former world title challengers Jose Caba and Felipe Orozco. McGuigan also overcame contenders Paul DeVorce and Charm Chiteule, retained his British and European titles against Clyde Ruan, and held on to the latter belt against Esteban Eguia to keep alive his chances of a world title fight.

In 1985, McGuigan met former world featherweight champion Juan Laporte and won by a decision after ten rounds. Following one more win (a defence of his European title against Farid Gallouze), McGuigan finally earned a tilt at a world title. Long-reigning WBA featherweight champion, Eusebio Pedroza of Panama, put his title on the line at Loftus Road football stadium on London. McGuigan became the champion by dropping Pedroza in round seven and winning a unanimous fifteen-round decision in a fight refereed by hall of fame referee Stanley Christodoulou. McGuigan and his wife were feted in a public reception through the streets of Belfast that attracted hundreds of thousands of well-wishers. Later that year, he was named BBC Sports Personality of the Year, becoming the first person not born in the United Kingdom to win the award.

McGuigan made his first defences against American Bernard Taylor, who was stopped in the ninth round, and Danilo Cabrera, who was knocked out in fourteen rounds. This proved to be a controversial stoppage: the fight was ended when the challenger bent over to pick up his mouthpiece after losing it, a practice that is allowed in many countries but not in Ireland. Cabrera was not aware of this rule and the fight was stopped. Although Cabrera's corner protested the outcome, McGuigan remained the winner by a knockout. For his next defence, he went to Las Vegas in June 1986, where he faced relatively unknown Steve Cruz from Texas as a late replacement for Ramon Fernando Sosa who pulled out for having two detached retinas. It proved to be a gruelling fifteen-round title bout under a blazing late-afternoon sun and 110-degree heat in the ring. McGuigan held the lead halfway through, but suffered dehydration because of the extreme heat and wilted near the end, being knocked down in rounds ten and fifteen. He eventually lost a close decision and his world belt, which he was never to reclaim. After the fight, McGuigan required hospitalisation because of his dehydrated state.

After that fight McGuigan retired partly due to the death of his father in 1987. He used to say his father was his greatest inspiration and, after his death, apparently felt no reason to continue boxing. However, with his relationship with previous manager Barney Eastwood now at an end, McGuigan returned to the ring between 1988 and 1989, under the management of Frank Warren. He beat former world title challengers Nicky Perez and Francisco Tomas da Cruz, as well as contender Julio César Miranda, before facing former EBU featherweight champ and future WBC and WBA super featherweight challenger Jim McDonnell. McGuigan lost by TKO when a gash over his right eye, caused by a McDonnell left hook in the second round, forced the referee to stop the fight in the fourth. McGuigan then retired permanently from boxing. His record was 32 wins and 3 losses, with 28 victories by knockout.

Professional boxing record

After boxing
McGuigan attempted to establish an association to protect the rights of boxers against what he, and others, considered omnipotent managers and promoters. In this regard, he had had a difficult time during his own career. A previously very close relationship with his manager, Barney Eastwood, deteriorated badly over time and led to a successful libel case against him by Eastwood several years later. He participated in The Grand Knockout Tournament 1987 charity event television special. In the 1980s, he was a chat show host on BBC1. 

McGuigan lives near Whitstable, Kent, with his wife. He currently works as a boxing pundit for Sky TV. Two biographies of McGuigan have been written. He is currently a boxing manager and promoter through Cyclone Promotions. McGuigan's relationship with world champion, Carl Frampton, whom he managed and promoted, ended in 2017. The matter was finally settled out of court in November 2020. McGuigan's daughter, Nika, died in 2019 aged 33.

He is the Chairman of the Professional Boxing Association, an organisation he has wanted to set up for over a decade, with the intention of teaching boxers the importance of education, and indeed educating them.

McGuigan has tried his hand at acting, appearing in the movie Malicious Intent in 2000. He also served as referee on the UK television game show Grudge Match, hosted by Nick Weir. He appeared in the third series of ITV's Hell's Kitchen in September 2007, where he was eventually crowned the winner after winning the public vote. In August 2009, he co-presented Charity Lords of the Ring with Lucy Kennedy.

Other recognition
McGuigan was inducted into the World Boxing Hall of Fame in 2000 and International Boxing Hall of Fame in 2005. He also fought in Ring Magazine'''s 1986 Fight of the Year, and was a title character in the 8-bit computer game, Barry McGuigan World Championship Boxing. McGuigan was honoured in an Irish ballad song released in 1984, "Clones Cyclone", written by Johnny McCauley and sung by Big Tom. The popular German musician and composer Udo Lindenberg also dedicated his song "Jonny Boxer" to McGuigan in 1986. The Bournemouth-based band The Worry Dolls named a track "Barry McGuigan" on their album, The Man That Time Forgot''. He was appointed a Member of the Order of the British Empire (MBE) in 1994.

See also

 List of featherweight boxing champions

References

External links

 
CLIC Sargent – children's cancer charity

|-

|-

1961 births
Living people
Irish male boxers
Male boxers from Northern Ireland
Featherweight boxers
World featherweight boxing champions
World Boxing Association champions
International Boxing Hall of Fame inductees
BBC Sports Personality of the Year winners
RTÉ Sports Person of the Year winners
Boxers at the 1978 Commonwealth Games
Boxers at the 1980 Summer Olympics
Commonwealth Games gold medallists for Northern Ireland
Commonwealth Games medallists in boxing
Members of the Order of the British Empire
Naturalised citizens of the United Kingdom
Olympic boxers of Ireland
People from Clones, County Monaghan
Reality cooking competition winners
Sportspeople from County Monaghan
Medallists at the 1978 Commonwealth Games